Cvetko Rajović (Vukovići, Ravno, 1793 – Belgrade, 4 May 1873) was a Serbian judge and politician who held the post of Prime Minister of Serbia, Minister of Internal Affairs and Minister of Foreign Affairs. Rajović was known as a staunch Obrenović dynasty supporter and the culprit of several plots aimed against the Karađorđević dynasty. He went on a mission with Avram Petronijević to Saint Petersburg in 1830 to purchase a new state printing press, which let to publishing of the official newspaper Novine Serbske edited by Dimitrije Davidović in early 1834.

References

1793 births
1873 deaths
Government ministers of Serbia
Foreign ministers of Serbia
Finance ministers of Serbia
Interior ministers
19th-century Serbian people